is a Japanese racing cyclist, who currently rides for Japanese amateur team Sparkle Ōita Racing Team. He rode in the men's team pursuit event at the 2018 UCI Track Cycling World Championships.

Major results
2015
 1st Road race, Asian Junior Cycling Championships
 1st  Road race, National Junior Road Championships 
2019
 1st Prologue Tour de Kumano

References

External links

1998 births
Living people
Japanese male cyclists
Place of birth missing (living people)
Asian Games medalists in cycling
Cyclists at the 2018 Asian Games
Medalists at the 2018 Asian Games
Asian Games bronze medalists for Japan
Japanese track cyclists